The Presbytery of Munster joined the Presbyterian Church in Ireland in 1854. Like the Synod of Ulster and the Secession Synod that amalgamated to form the PCI it was a pre-existing Presbyterian church body in Ireland.

Presbyterian Church in Ireland
Presbyterianism in the Republic of Ireland
Presbyteries and classes